Fladnitz refers to the following places in Austria:

 Fladnitz an der Teichalm, Gemeinde im Bezirk Weiz, Steiermark
 Fladnitz im Raabtal, Gemeinde im Bezirk Südoststeiermark